Granite station was the first Gettysburg Railroad train station east of Gettysburg, Pennsylvania, until an American Civil War station for Camp Letterman was built near the Hunterstown Road for supplying the hospital for Battle of Gettysburg wounded.  Gulden's Station was to the west near Low Dutch Road, and 600 Confederates were posted at Granite Station during Early's raids in Pennsylvania just prior to the Battle of Gettysburg.  The station was at the subsequent spur for the 1893 Granite Hill Railroad on a  serpentine path around Granite Hill to a quarry.  The station included an 1867 grain and hay business of Philip Hann & Sons, the Eckenrode warehouse sold in 1870, and the 1909 John Stallsmith warehouse.

References

Demolished railway stations in the United States
Railway stations in Pennsylvania
Former populated places in Pennsylvania
Railway stations in the United States opened in 1858
Former Western Maryland Railway stations